Telaa, or Tela-Masbuar (Masbuar-Tela) is an Austronesian language spoken in the two villages with those names on Babar Island in South Maluku, Indonesia.

References 

Babar languages
Languages of the Maluku Islands